Ifat Reshef is an Israeli diplomat who has been the ambassador to Switzerland and Liechtenstein since 2021.

Early life and education
Reshef was born in Hadera and grew up in Netanya.  She graduated from the Tel Aviv University Faculty of Law and the Hebrew University of Jerusalemfor her LL.M.

Career
She started at the Ministry of Foreign Affairs (Israel) in 1993 working for the legal department and Center for Political Research.  Reshef was posted in Egypt twice and was deputy ambassador in her second tour.

References

Living people
Ambassadors of Israel to Liechtenstein
Ambassadors of Israel to Switzerland
Hebrew University of Jerusalem Faculty of Law alumni
Israeli women ambassadors
Tel Aviv University alumni
Year of birth missing (living people)